Diego Ambuila (born 18 July 1993) is a Colombian football player.

References

1993 births
Living people
Colombian footballers
J1 League players
Sagan Tosu players
Place of birth missing (living people)
Association football forwards
Club Always Ready players